Rolf Juell Gleditsch (30 November 1892 – 13 January 1984) was a Norwegian painter.

He was born in Vardal. He was a second cousin of Odd, Ellen, Kristian and Henry Gleditsch, and a first cousin once removed of Kristen Gran Gleditsch and Jens Gran Gleditsch.

He studied in Stockholm from 1910 to 1913 and in Paris under Othon Friesz from 1919 to 1920. His main style was landscape paintings. He is represented in the National Gallery of Norway.

References

1892 births
1984 deaths
20th-century Norwegian painters
Norwegian expatriates in Sweden
Norwegian expatriates in France